Sanggeun (Korean: 상근이; born as Herbie, Korean: 허비; April 16, 2004 - April 11, 2014) was a South Korean dog actor. When Sanggeun first made his appearance on TV show 2 Days & 1 Night, he was named "Sanggeun" by Ji Sang-ryul. Ji Sang-ryul adopted Sangdon, Sanggeun's son. Sanggeun died on April 11, 2014, five days before his 10th birthday. Hoya, Sanggeun's son appeared in Season 3 Ep 23 of 2 Days & 1 Night a month after Sanggeun's death.

Filmography

Advertising
 LG Electronics phone
 LG Cyon Ice-cream phone
 KT Tech EVER Ever MGMG
 Aekyung S.T. Homes Air Fresh
 Outback Steakhouse
 English Moumou
 Lotte Confectionery Worldcorn
 BHC Chicken
 Hyundai Tucson

References

External links

2004 animal births
2014 animal deaths
Dog actors
Individual animals in South Korea